Carl Atkinson (-1985) was a renowned Australian diver and salvage expert from Darwin in the Northern Territory of Australia.

Diving

Atkinson lived at Doctor's Gully from 1945 to 1979, where he lived with his pet crocodile named Cuthbert, a snake named Sammy and many dogs. He is attributed with starting the practice of fish feeding, which locals and visitors to Doctor's Gully continue to do today.

Atkinson was an experienced diver for decades. He assisted police on several occasions with search and retrieval work.

Atkinson built a decompression chamber which was used by Japanese pearl divers to prevent suffering the ‘bends’ after diving. He is known to have saved at least 16 pearl divers lives with this equipment.

Salvage work

After World War II, Atkinson began acquiring the rights to salvage Darwin's wartime wrecks. Controversy erupted when Atkinson was required to pay heavy duty sales tax on the cargo. He nearly died during the salvage mission when his speedboat sank, leaving him adrift in Darwin Harbour for 11 hours.

In 1958, Atkinson sold the salvage rights to four wrecks to Japanese company Nanyo Boeki Kaisha Ltd, ahead of the Fujita salvage operation in 1959.

References

People from Darwin, Northern Territory
Australian underwater divers
1985 deaths
Year of birth missing
Marine salvage